The Eastex Advocate is a weekly newspaper circulated in Coldspring, Shepherd, Oakhurst and other portions of San Jacinto County, Texas, United States. Published each Wednesday, the newspaper is a free publication with a total circulation of 15,492.

Overview 
It was owned by ASP Westward LP until 2012, when it was acquired by 1013 Star Communications as part of its acquisition of Houston Community Newspapers. In 2016 the Hearst Corporation acquired Houston Community Newspapers; it is the parent company of the Houston Chronicle. As part of the deal the Advocate became a part of the Hearst Corporation.

References

External links

Liberty County, Texas
Newspapers published in Greater Houston
Hearst Communications publications
Weekly newspapers published in Texas